Abhirami is a 1992 Indian Tamil language drama film, directed by Dilip Kumar in his directorial debut and produced by R. B. Choudary. The film stars Saravanan, Sujatha and Kasthuri, with the supporting cast including Anju, Vinodhini, Rohini, Goundamani and Senthil. It was released on 27 November 1992.

Plot 
Abhirami has five daughters including Dhanam, Rajeshwari, Maheshwari. The eldest Dhanam is a soft-spoken woman who worked as typist, while Rajeshwari is a short-tempered woman, Maheshwari is a carefree teenager and the last two are little girls.

Saravanan is an orphan and jobless youth who is in love with Dhanam. He lives in a small hotel with his new friend Ramkanth. Saravanan finally finds a decent job in a clothes shop. He then moves with his friend Ramkanth near Dhanam's house. Saravanan slowly becomes one of their well-wishers but Saravanan learns that Dhanam will get married soon to someone else. The heartbroken Saravanan doesn't reveal his love and vacates the house.

On the wedding day, Abhirami has an accident and their jewels have been stolen. Saravanan rushes Abhirami to the hospital, he then takes jewels from his boss' daughter Vasanthi who is a widow. Afterwards, the wedding takes place. After the wedding, Saravanan reveals that Abhirami had died on the way to the hospital. Saravanan doesn't tell the truth for fear that the wedding would stop.

Now, the remaining four girls accept Saravanan as their brother and he decides to live with them. Saravanan and Vasanthi will get married soon.

Cast 

Saravanan as Saravanan
Sujatha as Abhirami
Kasthuri as Dhanam
Anju as Rajeshwari
Vinodhini as Maheshwari
Rohini as Vasanthi
Goundamani as Singaram
Senthil as Ramkanth (Ramasamy)
Vadivukkarasi as Lakshmi
C. R. Saraswathi as Saroja
Vijaya Chandrika
Shanmugasundari
Indira Devi
Ra. Sankaran
Kumarimuthu as conductor
Loose Mohan
Rajavelu
M. R. Krishnamurthy
Haja Shareef
Chitra Guptan as Ramkanth's uncle
Bayilvan Ranganathan as Ponnusamy
Swaminathan
Omakuchi Narasimhan as Arogyam
Pasi Narayanan
Thayir Vadai Desigan as Bheemarajan
Karuppu Subbiah as Ramkanth's father
Marthandan
Kottai Perumal
Baby Bhanu
Baby Bhavani
Nalinikanth
V. Gopalakrishnan as doctor
Kanal Kannan
Napoleon as Mr. Dhilip Kumar in a guest appearance
Siva in a guest appearance
Ramesh Khanna in a guest appearance
Dilip Kumar in a cameo appearance

Soundtrack 
The film score and the soundtrack were composed by Mano Ranjan, with lyrics written by Kalidasan, Vairamuthu and Dilip Kumar.

Reception 
Ayyappa Prasad of The Indian Express gave the film a positive review: "Dilip Kumar has handled the story with finesse" and praised the lead actors.

References

External links 
 

1990s Tamil-language films
1992 directorial debut films
1992 drama films
1992 films
Indian drama films
Super Good Films films